Shamshuzama Kazi (born 10 November 1994) is an Indian cricketer. He made his List A debut for Maharashtra in the 2014–15 Vijay Hazare Trophy on 11 November 2014. He made his first-class debut for Maharashtra in the 2017–18 Ranji Trophy on 17 November 2017.

References

External links
 

1994 births
Living people
Indian cricketers
Maharashtra cricketers
People from Nanded